Farmers Market is a Norwegian band founded in Trondheim, Sør-Trøndelag, in 1991. They have released four studio albums.

History
The band started out as a free jazz quintet sprung out from the conservatory in Trondheim, but now incorporates a wide variety of genres, such as jazz, rock, pop music, bluegrass, classical and most significantly Bulgarian folk music. Humorous arrangements, virtuosity and odd time signatures are characteristic to their style. Multi-instrumentalist Stian Carstensen is a sort of front figure, though guitarist Nils-Olav Johansen performs most of the lead vocals.

The band's original saxophonist Håvard Lund left the group in 1995, and they looked to Bulgaria for a replacement. Trifon Trifonov joined the band after auditioning by telephone.

They have performed at several international jazz festivals, including the Kongsberg Jazzfestival (in 1993, 1995 and 2009), Moldejazz (in 1994, 2003, 2004 and 2010), the North Sea Jazz Festival (in The Hague, Netherlands, in 2004) and the Berliner Festspiele (in 2005).

The band's debut album, Speed/Balkan/Boogie, was released in 1995. It is a live recording from two concerts held at Moldejazz 1994 with members from Grammy Award-winning Bulgarian female vocal group Le Mystère des Voix Bulgares and two Bulgarian folk musicians.

Their fourth studio album, Surfin' USSR, was awarded an open-class Spellemannpris (Norwegian Grammy Award equivalent) in 2008. It was released on Ipecac Recordings, a label distributed by the Universal Music Group.

The band has collaborated with several Norwegian orchestras, including the Norwegian Radio Orchestra, the Stavanger Symphony Orchestra, the Trondheim Symphony Orchestra and the Kristiansand Symphony Orchestra. They have also collaborated with American jazz saxophonist and composer Michael Brecker.

Members 

 Trifon Trifonov alto saxophone and clarinet (since 1995)
 Stian Carstensen accordion, kaval, gaida, guitar, pedal steel guitar, banjo and vocals
 Nils-Olav Johansen guitar and vocals
 Jarle Vespestad drums
 Finn Guttormsen bass guitar

Past member
 Håvard Lund alto saxophone (1991–1995)

Honors
 Spellemannprisen 2008, Open class
 Spellemannprisen 2012, Open class

Discography

Albums
1995: Speed / Balkan / Boogie
1997: Musikk fra Hybridene (Music from the Hybrids) (Kirkelig Kulturverksted)
2000: Farmers Market (Winter & Winter)
2008: Surfin' USSR (Ipecac Recordings)
2012: Slav to the Rhythm (Division Records)

See also

 List of bluegrass musicians
 List of folk musicians
 List of free improvising musicians and groups
 List of jazz musicians
 List of Norwegian musicians
 Music of Norway

References

External links

 
 

1991 establishments in Norway
Experimental musical groups
Free jazz ensembles
Musical groups established in 1991
Musical groups from Trondheim
Musical quintets
Norwegian bluegrass music groups
Norwegian classical music groups
Norwegian folk musical groups
Norwegian jazz ensembles
Spellemannprisen winners
Universal Music Group artists
Ipecac Recordings artists